The 1970–71 The Floridians season was the third season of American Basketball Association in Florida and first as The Floridians, after two seasons as the Miami Floridians. In an attempt to appeal to the entire regional, game were played in five cities: Miami, Tampa, St. Petersburg, Florida, Jacksonville, and West Palm Beach. New head owner Ned Doyle decided to get rid of the entire team, except the coach. The Floridians finished 9th in points scored at 114.0 per game, but 5th in points allowed at 115.6 per game. The team's biggest losing streak was 6, which happened less than a month after the season began, though a 5-game winning streak followed that. But by the first half of the season, they were 17–25, and Blitman was fired after they had lost their fifth straight game on January 14 to make them 18–30. One day later, Bob Bass was hired by the team after resigning from Texas Tech. The next day, he won his first game, versus the Utah Stars. A seven-game winning streak near the end of the season helped clinch a playoff spot for the team, with the key win being versus the Pittsburgh Condors on March 28, the penultimate game of the season played in Jacksonville, beating them 130–117 to eliminate Pittsburgh. In the Semifinals, they overcame a 2–0 hole to tie the series up, but the Kentucky Colonels won the next two games to win the series.

Roster
 24 Charles Beasley - Shooting guard
 12 Clarence Brookins - Forward
 21 Mack Calvin - Point guard
 21/44 Warren Davis - Power forward
 15 Ronald Franz - Small forward
 51 Carl Fuller - Center
 41 Ira Harge - Center
 12 Rich Johnson - Center
 32 Larry Jones - Shooting guard
 11 Ron Nelson - Shooting guard
 52 Rich Niemann - Center
 10 Fran O'Hanlon - Guard
 31 Sam Robinson - Small forward
 22 Dennis Stewart - Forward
 12 Al Tucker - Power forward
 14 Trooper Washington - Power forward
 22 Greg Wittman - Power forward
 20 Lonnie Wright - Shooting guard

Final standings

Eastern Division

Playoffs
Eastern Division Semifinals

The Floridians lose series, 4–2

Awards and honors
1971 ABA All-Star Game selections (game played on January 23, 1971)
 Mack Calvin
 Larry Jones

References

 Floridians on Basketball Reference

External links
 RememberTheABA.com 1970-71 regular season and playoff results
 The Floridians page

Miami Floridians seasons
Miami
The Floridians, 1970-71
The Floridians, 1970-71